The Palestinian Central Bureau of Statistics (PCBS) is the official
statistical institution of the State of Palestine. Its main task is to provide credible statistical figures at the national and international levels. It is a state institution that provides service to the governmental, non – governmental and private sectors in addition to research institutions and universities. It is established as an independent statistical bureau. The PCBS publishes the Statistical Yearbook of Palestine and the Jerusalem Statistical Yearbook annually.

The head office of the agency is in Ein Munjed Quarter, Ramallah.

Activities
Besides general statistics, such as the Retail Price Index, the PCBS also carries out special projects. It conducted the first Palestinian census in 1997, although Israel prevented the national census team from surveying the population in East Jerusalem. In 2007, the second census was carried out. In the 2007 census, a limited census was carried out in East Jerusalem.

Also, the PCBS provided the 2003 "Survey on the Impact of separation Wall on the Location Where it Passed Through".

The PCBS publishes the Statistical Yearbook of Palestine and the Jerusalem Statistical Yearbook annually.

Offices
The PCBS has its main office in the Balu'a area of Ramallah. In October 2001, the building was raided by the Israeli Defence Forces. The soldiers confiscated hard drives and vandalized a number of the offices. In March and April 2002, its Fieldwork section in downtown Ramallah was raided four times; soldiers searched the apartments.

Presidents
Dr. Hasan Abu Libdeh (1993–2005)
Dr. Luay Shabeneh (2005–2010)
Ola Awad (2011–present)

References

External links
Palestinian Central Bureau of Statistics
Palestinian Central Bureau of Statistics 
Statistical Yearbook of Palestine 2013, December 2013. (File size: 14.1 MB)

Government of the State of Palestine
PCBS